The 2018 Canberra Raiders season was the 37th in the club's history. Coached by Ricky Stuart and captained by Jarrod Croker, the Raiders completed the NRL's 2018 Telstra Premiership in 10th place and did not qualify for the finals.

Squad

Player Transfers

Gains

Loses

Fixtures

Trial Matches

NRL

Round 1

Round 2

Round 3

Round 4

Round 5

Round 6

Round 7

Round 8

Round 9

Round 10

Round 11

Round 12

Round 13

Round 14

Round 15

Round 16

Round 17

Round 18

Round 19

Round 20

Round 21

Round 22

Round 23

Round 24

Round 25 

 Green = Win, Red = Loss, Blue = Bye.

Ladder

2018 Meninga Medal Award Winners

NSW Cup Player of the Year –

NSW Cup Coaches Award –

Geoff Caldwell Welfare & Education Award – Joseph Tapine

Gordon McLucas Memorial Junior Representative Player of the Year - Jack Murchie

Fred Daly Memorial Club Person of the Year – Michael Oldfield

NRL Rookie of the Year – Emre Guler

NRL Coaches Award – Nick Cotric

Meninga Medal – Josh Papalii

References 

Canberra Raiders seasons
Canberra Raiders season